Era One is the 2006 album by Samael. It saw the band return to the Century Media label. It includes a bonus disc, "Lessons in Magic #1", which is entirely instrumental and done solely by band member Xy. The album itself was recorded in 2002, and the bonus disc a year later. Both were rearranged and remixed in 2005.

Track listing

Era One
 "Era One" (intro) - 2:33
 "Universal Soul" - 4:19
 "Sound of Galaxies" - 4:21
 "Beyond" (instrumental) - 2:59
 "Night Ride" - 4:40
 "Diamond Drops" - 4:26
 "Home" (instrumental) - 1:36
 "Voyage" - 4:00
 "Above as Below" - 5:03
 "Koh-i-Noor" - 5:03

Lessons in Magic #1 (completely instrumental) 
 "Connexion" - 4:28
 "Reading Mind" - 3:21
 "Red Unction" - 3:33
 "Flying High" - 4:04
 "Overcome" - 3:57
 "Inside Stairs" - 4:01
 "One with Everything" - 5:16
 "Silent Words" - 4:45
 "Wealth and Fortune" - 4:39

2006 albums
Samael (band) albums
Century Media Records albums